Mile Isaković (born 17 January 1958) is a Serbian handball coach and former player who competed for Yugoslavia in the 1980 Summer Olympics and in the 1984 Summer Olympics.

Club career
Born in Šabac, Isaković started out at his hometown club Metaloplastika. He would become the club's all-time top scorer, helping them win six Yugoslav Championships (1981–82, 1982–83, 1983–84, 1984–85, 1985–86, and 1987–88), four Yugoslav Cups (1979–80, 1982–83, 1983–84, and 1985–86), and two successive European Cups (1984–85 and 1985–86). In 1988, Isaković went abroad to France and spent three seasons with US Créteil.

International career
At international level, Isaković represented Yugoslavia for over a decade. He was an instrumental member of the team that won the gold medal at the 1984 Summer Olympics. Subsequently, Isaković helped Yugoslavia win the gold medal at the 1986 World Championship.

Coaching career
In 1991, Isaković started his coaching career at French club OM Vitrolles. He led the team to victory in the 1993 Cup Winners' Cup. Later on, Isaković served as head coach of Austrian women's team Hypo Niederösterreich (2004–05) and Italian men's team Secchia (2005–06). He would spend the next two seasons at the helm of his former club US Créteil.

Honours

Player
Metaloplastika
 Yugoslav Handball Championship: 1981–82, 1982–83, 1983–84, 1984–85, 1985–86, 1987–88
 Yugoslav Handball Cup: 1979–80, 1982–83, 1983–84, 1985–86
 European Cup: 1984–85, 1985–86
US Créteil
 Championnat de France: 1988–89
 Coupe de France: 1988–89

Coach
OM Vitrolles
 Championnat de France: 1993–94
 Coupe de France: 1992–93, 1994–95
 Cup Winners' Cup: 1992–93

References

External links

 Olympic record
 

1958 births
Living people
Sportspeople from Šabac
Serbian male handball players
Yugoslav male handball players
Olympic handball players of Yugoslavia
Olympic gold medalists for Yugoslavia
Handball players at the 1980 Summer Olympics
Handball players at the 1984 Summer Olympics
Olympic medalists in handball
Medalists at the 1984 Summer Olympics
Competitors at the 1983 Mediterranean Games
Mediterranean Games gold medalists for Yugoslavia
Mediterranean Games medalists in handball
RK Metaloplastika players
Handball-Bundesliga players
Expatriate handball players
Yugoslav expatriate sportspeople in Germany
Yugoslav expatriate sportspeople in France
Serbian handball coaches
Serbian expatriate sportspeople in Austria
Serbian expatriate sportspeople in Italy
Serbian expatriate sportspeople in France